Peter Barr (1826–1909) was a Scottish nurseryman and merchant, best known for daffodils.

Life
He was born in Govan, Lanarkshire, the son of James Barr, a mill owner, and his wife, Mary Findlay. From a seed shop in Glasgow, he moved to a seed merchant's in Newry, and then went into business in 1852 in a partnership in Worcester, concentrating on bulbs.

After a change of partners, Barr in 1860 was in the bulb trade in King Street, St James's in London. He was known for his catalogues, and for gaining the interest of British gardeners in daffodils, then neglected, inspired by the work of John Parkinson in the 17th century.

Legacy
The Peter Barr Memorial Cup is awarded each year by the Royal Horticultural Society to somebody who has done good work in relation to daffodils.

Notes

1826 births
1909 deaths
Nurserymen
Victoria Medal of Honour recipients
People from Govan
19th-century Scottish businesspeople